Athif Bin Ashraf (born 2 January 1997) is an Indian first-class cricketer who plays for Kerala. He made his first-class debut for Kerala in the 2016-17 Ranji Trophy on 7 December 2016. He made his List A debut for Kerala in the 2016–17 Vijay Hazare Trophy on 3 March 2017.

References

External links
 

1997 births
Living people
Indian cricketers
Kerala cricketers